At Pioneer Works is the third record and first live recording by Niger-based quartet Les Filles de Illighadad, released through Sahel Sounds in July 2021. It was recorded in Brooklyn at the Pioneer Works cultural center.

Critical reception

Bekki Bemrose for musicOMH saw At Pioneer Works as the band's "definitive record to date".

Track listing

Personnel 
All credits adapted from the record's Bandcamp page.

Les Filles de Illighadad
 Fatou Seidi Ghali - vocals, guitar 
 Alamnou Akrouni - vocals, percussion
 Amaria Hamadlher - guitar, percussion 
 Abdoulaye Madassane - vocals, percussion

References

2021 live albums
Blues albums by Nigerian artists